The eastern glass lizard (Ophisaurus ventralis) is a species of legless lizard in the family Anguidae, endemic to the Southeastern United States. The streamlined, legless species is often confused with snakes. Glass Lizards differ from snakes as they possess a moveable eyelid and an external ear opening, both of which are absent in snakes. Ventralis comes from the Latin "venter" meaning belly; this is in reference to the snake-like movement.

Description
There are 99 or more scales along the lateral groove. In this species, no dark longitudinal stripes are present below the lateral groove or under the tail, and there is no distinct mid-dorsal stripe. The neck is marked with a series of mostly vertical, or highly irregular, white marks, with white markings on posterior corners of scales. Dorsally, older specimens have a pattern consisting of numerous longitudinal dark lines or dashes. Occasionally, similar parallel lines cover the entire mid-dorsal area. Older adults may be greenish above and yellow below; this is the only Ophisaurus species that may have a greenish appearance. Juveniles are khaki-colored and usually have two dark stripes that run down the back. O. ventralis are commonly mistaken as a species of snake because they lack limbs. Unlike snakes, they have moveable eyelids, external ear openings located behind their eyes, and inflexible jaws. 

No subspecies are currently recognized.

Habitat 
Eastern glass lizards are a common species near wetlands and moist soils. O. ventralis habitat consists of flatwoods adjacent to wetlands with sandy soils. They heavily rely on prescribed fire to maintain their habitat.  They have also been found in tidal areas such as coastal dunes because they are resistant to salty conditions.

A study in 2020 found O. ventralis using a crayfish burrow as habitat in southeastern Mississippi. Various invertebrates and vertebrates are known to use these burrows but this is the first time a lizard species has been documented using a crayfish burrow. Limited research has been done but could be more widespread behavior.

Distribution
O. ventralis is commonly found from extreme southeastern Virginia to south Florida and west to Louisiana. Isolated records exist of its occurrence in Oklahoma and Missouri.

Diet
O. ventralis eats a range of insects, such as grasshoppers, crickets and beetles, and will also consume spiders, small mice, snails, and the eggs of other reptiles and ground-nesting birds. Unlike snakes, glass lizards do not have flexible jaws, and this limits the size of prey items they can consume. They forage both above ground and underground in burrows.

Reproduction 
O. ventralis is oviparous and lays around 5-15 eggs in June and July. Eggs are usually laid under cover or in depressions and sandy or loamy soil. Females will encircle their clutch but may retreat when approached and generally do not defend their eggs.

Gallery

References

Further reading
Behler JL, King FW (1979). The Audubon Society Field Guide to North American Reptiles and Amphibians. New York: Alfred A. Knopf. 743 pp. (Ophisaurus ventralis, pp. 544–545 + Plates 453, 456).
Daudin FM (1803). Histoire Naturelle, Générale et Particulière des Reptiles; Ouvrage faisant suite aux Œuvres de Leclerc de Buffon, et partie du Cours complet d'Histoire naturelle rédigé par C.S. Sonnini, membre de plusieurs Sociétés savantes. Tome septième [Volume 7]. Paris: F. Dufart. 436 pp. (Ophisaurus ventralis, new combination, pp. 352–356 + Plate LXXXVIII). (in French and Latin).
Linnaeus C (1766). Systema naturæ per regna tria naturæ, secundum classes, ordines, genera, species, cum characteribus, differentiis, synonymis, locis. Tomus I. Editio Duodecima, Reformata. Stockholm: L. Salvius. 532 pp. (Anguis ventralis, new species, p. 391). (in Latin).
Smith HM, Brodie ED Jr (1982). Reptiles of North America: A Guide to Field Identification. New York: Golden Press. 240 pp. . (Ophisaurus ventralis, pp. 90–91).
Zim HS, Smith HM (1956). Reptiles and Amphibians: A Guide to Familiar Species: A Golden Nature Guide. Revised Edition. New York: Simon and Schuster. 160 pp. (Ophisaurus ventralis, pp. 67, 155).

External links

 Eastern Glass Lizard (Ophisaurus ventralis) at SREL Herpetology. Accessed 30 June 2008.
 Eastern Glass Lizard (Ophisaurus ventralis) at Virginia Dept. of Game and Inland Fisheries. Accessed 30 June 2008.

Ophisaurus
Reptiles described in 1766
Taxa named by Carl Linnaeus
Reptiles of the United States
Endemic fauna of the United States